Kyriakos Mitsotakis (born 4 March 1968) is a Greek politician serving as the prime minister of Greece since 8 July 2019. A member of the New Democracy, he has been its president since 2016. He previously was Leader of the Opposition from 2016 to 2019, and Minister of Administrative Reform from 2013 to 2015.

He was first elected to the Hellenic Parliament for the Athens B constituency in 2004. After New Democracy suffered two election defeats in 2015, he was elected the party's leader in January 2016. Three years later, he led his party to a majority in the 2019 election.

During his term as PM, Mitsotakis has received praise for his pro-European and technocratic governance, his handling of the COVID-19 pandemic, his handling of migration, and his handling of the Greek economy, with Greece being named the Top Economic Performer for 2022 by The Economist. This was in particular due to Greece in 2022 being able to repay ahead of schedule 2.7 billion euros ($2.87 billion) of loans owed to Eurozone countries under the first bailout it received during its decade-long debt crisis. However,  Mitsotakis has also received criticism, as during his term, Greece has experienced democratic backsliding and heightened corruption, a deterioration of freedom of the press, and his term was also marred by the Novartis corruption scandal the 2022 wiretapping scandal, as well as the tragic Feb. 2023 fatal train collision between a freight and passenger train accidentally routed on the same track.

Early life
Kyriakos Mitsotakis was born in Athens on 4 March 1968, the son of Marika (née Giannoukou) and former Greek prime minister and New Democracy president Konstantinos Mitsotakis. At the time of his birth, his family had been placed under house arrest by the Greek military junta that had declared his father persona non grata and imprisoned him on the night of the coup. In 1968, when he was six months old, the family escaped to Turkey with the help of Turkish Minister of Foreign Affairs İhsan Sabri Çağlayangil. After a while, they moved from Turkey to Paris and waited until 1974 to return to Greece after democracy had been restored. Later, Mitsotakis described the first six months of his life as political imprisonment.

In 1986, Mitsotakis graduated from Athens College. From 1986 to 1990, he attended Harvard University and earned a bachelor's degree in social studies, receiving the Hoopes Prize. Later, his senior thesis was published as a book titled «The Pitfalls of Foreign Policy» receiving mixed reviews. From 1992 to 1993, he attended Stanford University, earning a Ford Dorsey Master's in International Policy. From 1993 to 1995, he attended Harvard Business School, where he earned an MBA.

Professional career
From 1990 to 1991 Kyriakos Mitsotakis worked as a financial analyst at the corporate finance division of Chase Bank in London. From 1991 to 1992, Mitsotakis returned to Greece and joined the Hellenic Army to fulfil his mandatory national service obligations. From 1995 to 1997, and following the completion of his post-graduate studies, he was employed by the consultancy McKinsey & Company in London, focusing primarily on the telecommunications and financial services industries. From 1997 to 1999 he worked for Alpha Ventures, a private equity subsidiary of Alpha Bank, as a senior investment officer, executing venture capital and private equity transactions. In 1999 he founded NBG Venture Capital, the private equity and venture capital subsidiary of the National Bank of Greece, and acted as its CEO, managing its portfolio and executing transactions in Greece and the Balkans, until April 2003, when he resigned to pursue a career in politics.

In January 2003, he was nominated by the World Economic Forum as a global leader of tomorrow.

Political career
During the 2000 legislative election, Mitsotakis worked for New Democracy's national campaign. In the 2004 legislative election, Mitsotakis ran in the Athens B constituency, receiving more votes than any other New Democracy candidate in the country and was elected to the Hellenic Parliament.

Mitsotakis is honorary president of Konstantinos K. Mitsotakis Foundation, aiming at promoting the life and works of Konstantinos Mitsotakis and at reporting the modern political history of Greece.

On 24 June 2013, Mitsotakis was appointed as the Minister of Administrative Reform and e-Governance in Antonis Samaras' cabinet, succeeding Antonis Manitakis. He served in this position until January 2015. During this time, he pursued comprehensive national reforms by implementing a functional reorganization of institutions, structures and processes. He steadfastly supported the drastic downsizing of the Public Sector and the structural reform of the tax administration.

In 2015, Mitsotakis served as a parliamentary representative for New Democracy, representing the President of the party in Parliament, as well as the body of the party's Representatives. He was charged with expressing the positions of his party during Parliamentary procedures and discourse, as well as ensuring the proper function of Parliament through a process of checks and balances. In March 2015, he claimed that then-Minister of Finance Yanis Varoufakis was undermining the Greek negotiations over the third bailout programme, saying: "Every time he opens his mouth, he creates a problem for the country's negotiating position."

Mitsotakis was the first of four New Democracy members to announce their candidacy in the leadership election, declared following the resignation of Antonis Samaras as party leader and the failure of New Democracy in the September 2015 snap election. Amongst the other contestants was then-interim leader and former Speaker of the Hellenic Parliament Vangelis Meimarakis. According to the Financial Times, Mitsotakis was "billed as an outsider in the leadership race" due to the party establishment's support of Meimarakis' candidacy. Following the first round of voting with no clear winner, Mitsotakis came second, 11% behind Meimarakis.

On 10 January 2016, Mitsotakis was elected president of the New Democracy political party succeeding Ioannis Plakiotakis (transitional president) with almost 4% difference from opponent Vangelis Meimarakis. A week following Mitsotakis' election as leader, two opinion polls were published that put New Democracy ahead of Syriza for the first time in a year.

His party won 33% of the votes in the European elections in 2019. He managed to win back votes from the Golden Dawn Party. Following the election results, the Hellenic Parliament was dissolved and a snap election was called.

Prime Minister of Greece

New Democracy was victorious in the 2019 legislative election, scoring 39.85% of votes and securing 158 seats in the Hellenic Parliament.

On 8 July 2019, Greek President Prokopis Pavlopoulos accepted Tsipras' resignation and tasked Mitsotakis with forming a new government. Mitsotakis was sworn in as prime minister the same day as well. On 9 July, the ministers in his government were sworn in. Among his cabinet was Makis Voridis, a former member of the far-right Popular Orthodox Rally, who was met with a cold reception abroad and by the Jewish community in Greece. Israel announced that it would not cooperate with Voridis.

From 2019 onwards, it is launching a wave of privatizations, including tourism infrastructure, coastal land, and state-owned shares in the gas and electricity companies and Athens airport. On the other hand, a tax reform aimed at making the country "a haven for billionaires and the wealthiest citizens", the Financial Times notes, is being implemented. The aim is to attract investment by offering low tax rates. A clause will protect the beneficiaries of this tax policy from possible policy changes by future governments.

The "big growth bill", adopted in the summer of 2020, provides for the restriction of the right to strike and the abolition of collective agreements, which had already been suspended in 2012 at the request of the Troika and then reinstated by the Tsipras government. Migration policy has been tightened: the coverage of hospital care for destitute foreigners has been abolished and the period during which refugees who have been granted asylum can reside in public housing has been reduced from six months to one month. On environmental issues, the government reformed legislation to facilitate oil exploration.

Mitsotakis' government has been praised by observers for its handling of the COVID-19 pandemic as well as for its plans for spending a €31bn share of the EU's Recovery Plan and for its orderly vaccination roll-out. Additionally, the common Covid-19 certificate was credited to Mitsotakis, and his idea has been taken up at a European level. Mitsotakis had criticized the initially slow pace of the EU's COVID-19 vaccine rollout, and he had called for its acceleration.

Measures were implemented from March to May 2020 and from November 2020 until May 2021, when their gradual lifting started. The controls included the introduction of various movement restrictions, the suspension of operation of retail, catering and entertainment businesses, as well as schools and churches.

In August 2020, a reform of the labour law was adopted. It provides for the possibility of an employer to dismiss employees without having to give reasons for the decision or give prior notice to the persons concerned. The tax authorities' anti-fraud unit was abolished and its employees integrated into the Ministry of Finance.

There is a long-standing dispute between Turkey and Greece over natural resources in the eastern Mediterranean. Mitsotakis said that Turkey "remains stuck in the logic of using force and threats." He told NATO Secretary General Jens Stoltenberg that Greece is "contributing to NATO, we are an ally and have the expectation that when another NATO ally is behaving in a way that jeopardises our interests, NATO should not adopt this stance of equal distances and non-intervention in internal differences. It is deeply unfair to Greece."

In July 2020, Mitsotakis awarded honorary Greek citizenship to American actor Tom Hanks and his wife, American actress Rita Wilson, the latter of whom is half Greek.

On May 16, 2022, Mitsotakis met with U.S. President Joe Biden at the White House. On the next day, Mitsotakis became the first Prime Minister of Greece to address a Joint session of the United States Congress at the invitation of U.S. House Speaker Nancy Pelosi.

During Mitsotakis' term as PM, he has received praise for being pro-European and governing technocratic, his handling of the COVID-19 pandemic, his handling of migration, and his handling of the Greek economy, with Greece being named the Top Economic Performer for 2022 by the Economist. This was in particular due to Greece in 2022 being able to repay ahead of schedule 2.7 billion euros ($2.87 billion) of loans owed to euro zone countries under the first bailout it received during its decade-long debt crisis. Mitsotakis has also received criticism as Greece has experienced a democratic backsliding and heightened corruption, with a deterioration of freedom of the press, and was marred by the Novartis corruption scandal and the 2022 wiretapping scandal.

Migration 
Mitsotakis adopted a hardline stance on the European Migrant Crisis by resorting to human rights violations, including pushbacks of thousands of migrants in an attempt to prevent their entry into Greece. He received praise from the European Union for his handling of the crisis and received economic support of €700m.

Lockdown violations 
In December 2020, Mitsotakis was criticized after a photo of him surfaced on social media, in which he posed with five other people while not wearing a mask, during a time when Greece had a nationwide lockdown and mask wearing was mandatory both indoors and outdoors.  On 6 February 2021 Mitsotakis visited the island of Icaria to inspect the progress of COVID-19 vaccinations in the area. During this visit, he attended a lunch organized by MP Christodoulos I. Stefanadis along with his entourage numbering up to 40 people. The incident was covered by both Greek and international media and Mitsotakis was heavily criticized for violating the existing COVID-19 containment measures. Mitsotakis publicly apologized for the Icaria incident, saying this will never happen again and that "the image hurt the citizens".

Mandatory COVID-19 measures and vaccinations
In May 2021, when the Mitsotakis government announced the country's opening for tourism on 14 May, it was criticised initially, because movement control measures, such as the obligation to send an SMS at particular sites, were retained temporarily. Other measures still in place after the re-opening of tourism were the daily curfew, from 00:30, the obligatory use of face masks indoors and outdoors, the ban on music in cafes and restaurants, and the ban on the operation of indoor restaurants throughout May. Casinos were allowed to operate, with a specific sanitary protocol. In an interview on 27 May 2021, Mitsotakis did not give a clear answer as to when and if the above measures would be lifted in the summer. He referred to a roadmap for lifting the controls, but did not elaborate. He also estimated that tourism in 2021 in Greece would be around 50% of levels experienced in 2019. Despite criticism, Greece was awarded the "Global Champion Award for COVID-19 Crisis Management" by the World Travel and Tourism Council, which "commends" the Greek Government as "a global example for the safe opening of the tourism sector during the pandemic."

Press freedom 
Under Mitsotakis, Greece has declined in press freedom. Violence against journalists has also increased, resulting to a deterioration of the Greek freedom of the press.

Wiretapping Scandal 

In July 2022, the leader of political party PASOK, Nikos Androulakis, revealed that there was an attempt of bugging his phone with spyware program "Predator". In a closed-door parliamentary hearing that was called by Androulakis, the chief of Greek Intelligence Service, P. Kontoleon, admitted that his service had spied Greek journalist Thanassis Koukakis, who has also complained about being targeted by "Predator". After the publication of an investigation by Efsyn and Reporters United that Grigoris Dimitriadis, Mitsotakis's nephew and general secretary, had connections with Felix Bitsios, the owner of the company that markets the "Predator", Dimitriadis submitted his resignation. Shortly after, the chief of Greek Intelligence Service, Panagiotis Kontoleon, also stepped down over an allegation that his service had tapped Androulakis's phone. Mitsotakis himself has actively worked to block any investigation on the wiretapping scandal from concluding.

Train collision 

On 28 Feb. 2023, a freight train and a passenger train traveling in opposite directions between Athens and Thessaloniki were inadvertently routed on the same track; 57 people were killed in the head-on collision near Tempi. Amid rising anger and nationwide protests, Mitsotakis offered "a public apology on behalf of those who ruled the country over the years", took responsibility for the disaster and vowed to fix the long-neglected rail system. He said the government would invest more than 270 million Euros to hire more staff and to install digital control systems by August.

Personal life
Mitsotakis is the younger brother of former Minister for Foreign Affairs and Mayor of Athens Dora Bakoyannis, making him the brother-in-law of the late Pavlos Bakoyannis, who was assassinated by the terrorist group 17 November in 1989 and the uncle of Kostas Bakoyannis, former Regional Governor of Central Greece and current Mayor of Athens.

Mitsotakis is married to Mareva Grabowska, an investment banker with British, Greek, Polish and Egyptian roots. They have three children, Sophia, Konstantinos and Daphne.

In addition to Greek, Mitsotakis speaks English, French and German.

Venizelos/Mitsotakis family tree

See also
List of international trips made by Kyriakos Mitsotakis

References

External links

  
 

|-

|-

}
|-

|-

1968 births
Living people
21st-century prime ministers of Greece
Greek bankers
Greek MPs 2004–2007
Greek MPs 2007–2009
Greek MPs 2009–2012
Greek MPs 2012 (May)
Greek MPs 2012–2014
Greek MPs 2015 (February–August)
Greek MPs 2015–2019
Greek MPs 2019–2023
Prime Ministers of Greece
Harvard Business School alumni
Leaders of New Democracy (Greece)
McKinsey & Company people
Ministers of Administrative Reform and e-Governance of Greece
Kyriakos
New Democracy (Greece) politicians
Politicians from Athens
Stanford University alumni
Businesspeople from Athens
Children of national leaders